2011 Turkish Basketball League (TBL) Playoffs was the final phase of the 2010–11 Turkish Basketball League season. The playoffs started on 11 May 2011. Fenerbahçe Ülker were the defending champions.

The eight highest placed teams of the regular season qualified for the playoffs. All series were best-of-5 except the final, which was best-of-7. Under Turkish league rules, if a team swept its playoff opponent in the regular season, it was granted an automatic 1–0 series lead, and the series started with Game 2.

Fenerbahçe Ülker competed against Galatasaray Café Crown in the finals, won the series 4-2 and got their 5th championship.

Bracket

Quarterfinals

Fenerbahçe Ülker vs. Antalya BB

Banvit vs. Olin Edirne

Efes Pilsen vs. Pınar Karşıyaka

Galatasaray Café Crown vs. Beşiktaş Cola Turka

Semifinals

Fenerbahçe Ülker vs. Efes Pilsen

Banvit vs. Galatasaray Café Crown

Finals

Fenerbahçe Ülker vs. Galatasaray Café Crown

References
TBL.org.tr
TBF.org.tr
TBLStat.net

Playoff
Turkish Basketball Super League Playoffs